These are the official results of the Men's 3.000 metres Steeplechase event at the inaugural 1983 IAAF World Championships in Helsinki, Finland. There were a total of 35 participating athletes, with three qualifying heats and the final held on 12 August 1983.

Medalists

Summary

On a cold and rainy day, Tommy Ekblom sprinted off the line to take the early lead.  Half a lap into the race he was almost 10 metres off the front absorbing the enthusiasm of the home crowd as the pack strung out behind him.  Over the next two laps, Colin Reitz led the pack to pull back the lead as Ekblom's pace slowed on the second lap. Reitz was comfortable to wait on Ekblom's shoulder. Henry Marsh typically was off the back of the string, at times over 5 metres behind the last athlete. Ekblom continued to lead, the pack bunching up behind him with Marsh joining on the fifth lap but nobody moving past. Finally with a lap and a half to go, Mariano Scartezzini dared to go past, accelerating to take a couple of metres until Bogusław Mamiński went off in chase going into the bell, then the racing began. Wiggling through Reitz and Mamiński on the inside, Patriz Ilg pulled up to the challenging position with Marsh coming around the outside to join him. Before the final back stretch, Ilg went by and separated off the front. Mamiński squeezed inside of Marsh to take off in chase, only Marsh and Reitz still in contact. Picking up speed, Marsh passed Mamiński, then moving toward the outside he had room to pass Ilg on the outside going into the last barrier. Then Marsh hit the barrier. It didn't go down. Marsh did. Ilg was gone to victory. As Marsh tried to find his way to his feet, Mamiński, Reitz and Joseph Mahmoud went by to finish in that order.

Records
Existing records at the start of the event.

Final

Semi finals
Held on Wednesday 1983-08-10

Qualifying heats
Held on Tuesday 1983-08-09

See also
 1980 Men's Olympic 3.000m Steeplechase (Moscow)
 1982 Men's European Championships 3.000m Steeplechase (Athens)
 1984 Men's Olympic 3.000m Steeplechase (Los Angeles)
 1986 Men's European Championships 3.000m Steeplechase (Stuttgart)
 1987 Men's World Championships 3.000m Steeplechase (Rome)

References
 Results

S
Steeplechase at the World Athletics Championships